Transmigration may refer to:

 Transmigration of the soul or reincarnation, a spiritual belief
 Transmigration program, the programme to move landless people from densely populated areas of Indonesia to less populous areas of the country
 Transmigration (album), a 1993 album by Crematory
 Transmigration, a 2009 album by the Atlanta Symphony Orchestra and Choruses, winner of a Grammy Award for Best Surround Sound Album
 Transmigration, a 2006 album by Bakithi Kumalo
 Transmigration (novel), a 1970 novel by J. T. McIntosh

See also
 Leukocyte transmigration, the process of immune cells exiting from blood vessels to tissue
 Transmigration of cancer cells, a process that is involved in metastasis and secondary tumor formation.